The Poultry Building and Incubator House is a house located on the Oregon State University campus in Corvallis, Oregon, designed by prominent architect John Virginius Bennes. The house is registered on the National Register for Historic Places.

See also
 National Register of Historic Places listings in Benton County, Oregon

References

National Register of Historic Places in Benton County, Oregon
Oregon State University